Monsignor James MacCaffrey STL, PhD (1875 – 1935) was an Irish priest, theologian and historian.

Biography
Monsignor MacCaffrey was born in 1875, at Fivemiletown, Co. Tyrone, he was the son of Francis MacCaffrey of Alderwood, Clogher, Co. Tyrone. He was educated at St. Macartan's Seminary, Monaghan, before going to St. Patrick's College, Maynooth, and was ordained there in 1899.

He was awarded a Doctorate by the University of Freiburg. At Maynooth he went on to serve as Professor of Ecclesiastical History from 1901, vice-president (1915–1918) and president of the College from 1918 until 1935.

A noted historian Dr. MacCaffrey edited the early editions of the Historical Journal published in Maynooth Archivium Hibernicum. He also served on the editorial board of the Irish Theological Quarterly.
Monsignor MacCaffrey also served as Pro-Vice-Chancellor of the National University of Ireland
He died on 1 November 1935 while still president of Maynooth.

Publications
 "Louis Veuillot," The Irish Ecclesiastical Record 16 (1904); Part II, Part III, The Irish Ecclesiastical Record 17 (1905).
 The Black Book of Limerick (1906).
 History of the Catholic Church in the Nineteenth-century (1909)
 History of the Catholic Church: From the Renaissance to the French Revolution (1915).

References

External links

 
 
 

1875 births
1935 deaths
20th-century Irish historians
19th-century Irish Roman Catholic priests
People from County Tyrone
Alumni of St Patrick's College, Maynooth
Academics of St Patrick's College, Maynooth
Presidents of St Patrick's College, Maynooth
Burials at Maynooth College Cemetery
20th-century Irish Roman Catholic priests